Nizhneye Chugli is a rural locality (a selo) in Levashinsky District, Republic of Dagestan, Russia. The population was 1,532 as of 2010. There are 5 streets.

Geography 
Nizhneye Chugli is located 5 km northwest of Levashi (the district's administrative centre) by road, on the Nakhker river. Khakhita and Levashi are the nearest rural localities.

Nationalities 
Avars live there.

References 

Rural localities in Levashinsky District